The 2022 ECAC Hockey Men's Ice Hockey Tournament was the 61st tournament in league history. It was played between March 4 and March 19, 2022. By winning the tournament, Harvard received an automatic bid to the 2022 NCAA Division I Men's Ice Hockey Tournament.

Format
The tournament features four rounds of play. The teams that finish above fifth place in the standings received a bye to the quarterfinal round. In the first round, the fifth and twelfth seeds, the sixth and eleventh seeds, the seventh and tenth seeds and the eighth and ninth seeds played a best-of-three series with the winners advancing to the quarterfinals. In the quarterfinals the one seed played the lowest remaining seed, the second seed played the second-lowest remaining seed, the third seed played the third-lowest remaining seed and the fourth seed played the fourth-lowest remaining seed in another best-of-three series with the winners of these the series advancing to the semifinals. In the semifinals the top remaining seed played the lowest remaining seed while the two remaining teams play against each other. The winners of the semifinals play in the championship game, and no third-place game is played. All series after the quarterfinals are single-elimination games. The tournament champion receives an automatic bid to the 2022 NCAA Division I Men's Ice Hockey Tournament.

Conference standings

Bracket

Note: * denotes overtime periods

Results
Note: All game times are local.

First round

(5) Colgate vs. (12) Yale

(6) Rensselaer vs. (11) Dartmouth

(7) Union vs. (10) Princeton

(8) St. Lawrence vs. (9) Brown

Quarterfinals

(1) Quinnipiac vs. (8) St. Lawrence

(2) Clarkson vs. (7) Union

(3) Harvard vs. (6) Rensselaer

(4) Cornell vs. (5) Colgate

Semifinal

(1) Quinnipiac vs. (5) Colgate

(2) Clarkson vs. (3) Harvard

Championship

(1) Quinnipiac vs. (3) Harvard

Tournament awards

Most Outstanding Player(s)
Matthew Coronato

References

ECAC Hockey Men's Ice Hockey Tournament
ECAC Hockey Men's Ice Hockey Tournament
ECAC Men's Ice Hockey Hockey Tournament